Jasmine Krotkov (born September 30, 1963) is an American politician who served as a member of the Montana House of Representatives for the 25th district from 2019 to 2021. Elected in 2018, she assumed office on January 7, 2019.

Early life and education 
She earned an associate degree in political systems from Bard College at Simon's Rock and a Bachelor of Arts degree in AgroEcology from World College West. Krotkov also earned a certificate in graphic design from the California Institute of the Arts and another in horticulture from the University of California, Berkeley.

Career 
From 1993 to 2014, Krotkov was an employee of the United States Postal Service. She also worked as a board member, legislative director and Editor of the United Postmasters and Managers of America. Krotkov has also worked as a landscape designer. Krotkov was elected to the Montana House of Representatives in 2018 and assumed office on January 7, 2019.

References 

Living people
1963 births
Politicians from Great Falls, Montana
Bard College alumni
Democratic Party members of the Montana House of Representatives
Women state legislators in Montana
21st-century American politicians
21st-century American women politicians